Elitzur Ramla is a women's basketball team from Ramla, Israel. Ramla is one of the leading women's basketball teams in Israel. The team won the Israel Championship 11 times and the State Cup 6 times and is the first and only Israeli women's team to win the triple which they won the Eurocup Cup, the Premier League Championship, and the State Cup in the 2011 season.

History
In March 2011, Elitzur Ramla won the EuroCup Women, after  a 61-53 triumph against ASPTT Arras from France. It is considered  the best team in the history of Israeli women's basketball. The team also won 8 Israeli league championships and 4 Israeli State Cups.

Elitzur Ramla's home court is the Kiryat Menahem Arena in Ramla, with a capacity of 2,000.

Current roster
(as of January 2023)

Honours

International competitions
EuroCup Women:
Winners (1): 2011
SuperCup Women:
Runners-up (1): 2011

Domestic competitions
Israeli Female Basketball Premier League:
Winners (11): 1996, 1998, 2000, 2004, 2005, 2007, 2008, 2011, 2013, 2019, 2022
Runners-up (6): 2003, 2009, 2012, 2014, 2015, 2018
Israeli State Cup:
Winners (6): 2004, 2007, 2009, 2011, 2014, 2019
Runners-up (10): 1993, 1994, 1995, 1996, 1997, 1998, 1999, 2003, 2005, 2010
Winner Cup:
Winners (2): 2010, 2013

Notable former players

See also
Sport in Israel

References

Sport in Ramla
Women's basketball teams in Israel
EuroCup Women-winning clubs
Basketball teams established in 1970